Thatcher Memorial Fountain a fountain located in  City Park, Denver, Colorado, was created by sculptor Lorado Taft and dedicated in 1918.

The fountain, dedicated to the memory of Joseph Addison Thatcher who died in 1918 consists of a central figure representing The State or Colorado surrounded by three groups, Loyalty, Love, and Learning.

Joseph Addison Thatcher was a wealthy Denver businessman and banker.

References

External links

 

1918 establishments in Colorado
1918 sculptures
Bronze sculptures in Colorado
Monuments and memorials in Colorado
Outdoor sculptures in Denver
Sculptures by Lorado Taft
Sculptures of men in Colorado
Sculptures of women in Colorado
Statues in Colorado
Tourist attractions in Denver